Beeston is a surname. Notable people with the surname include:

Alfred Felix Landon Beeston (1911–1995), professor of Arabic
Carl Beeston (born 1967), English footballer
Christopher Beeston (c. 1579 – 1638), actor
James Beeston (1778-?), English cricketer
John Beeston, an alternative name of James Beeston, cricketer
Julian Beeston, English musician
Kevin Beeston (born 1962), Welsh businessman
Paul Beeston (born 1945), Canadian baseball executive
W Beeston (Middlesex cricketer) (fl. 1789–1799)
William Beeston (c. 1606 – 1682), actor

English toponymic surnames